The Xong language is the northernmost Hmongic language, spoken in south-central China by around 0.9 million people. It is called  ("Western Hunan Miao") in Chinese, as well as Eastern Miao. Western sources, it has been called Meo, Red Miao, and North Hmongic (Ratliff 2010). An official alphabet was adopted in 1956.

Distribution 
Xong is spoken mainly in Hunan province, but also in a few areas of Guizhou and Hubei provinces, the Guangxi autonomous region and Chongqing municipality in China. Xong-speaking communities, by county, are,

Western (Xong): 800,000 speakers (autonym )
Hunan
Huayuan County, Xiangxi
Jishou, Xiangxi
Fenghuang County, Xiangxi
Baojing County, Xiangxi
Longshan County, Xiangxi
Xinhuang Dong Autonomous County, Huaihua
Mayang Miao Autonomous County, Huaihua
Guizhou
Songtao Miao Autonomous County
Tongren County
Hubei
Xuan'en County
Chongqing
Xiushan Tujia and Miao Autonomous County, Qianjiang
Youyang Tujia and Miao Autonomous County, Qianjiang
Guangxi
Hechi (including Beiya 坝牙村 of Xia'ao 下坳乡, Yong'an 永安乡, and Banling 板岭乡 of Du'an County)
Nandan County
Eastern (Suang): 80,000 speakers
Hunan
Jishou, Xiangxi (e.g., in Xiaozhangzhai 小章寨, with autonym )
Longshan County, Xiangxi (e.g., in Wujiazhai 吴家寨)
Guzhang County, Xiangxi
Luxi County, Xiangxi (e.g., in Dongtouzhai 洞头寨, with autonym )

Classification 
Xong was classified in its own branch of the Hmongic family in Strecker (1987). Xiang (1999) divided Xong into western and eastern dialects. Matisoff (2001) considered these to be two distinct languages, but Matisoff (2006) consolidated them into one. Yang (2004) divides each of these dialects into three subdialects, as listed below. Speaker populations and locations are from Li and Li (2012).

Western (includes standardized Xong)
Lect 1: Jiwei 吉卫, Huayuan County; 769,000 speakers in the counties of Fenghuang (except Baren 叭仁乡), most of Huayuan, southern Jishou, Xinhuang, Mayang, Songtao, parts of Rongjiang, parts of Ziyun, Xiushan, parts of Nandan, parts of Hechi, and parts of Du'an.
Lect 2: Yangmeng 阳孟, Jishou; 120,000 speakers in the counties of eastern Huayuan, western and northern Jishou, eastern Baojing, southwestern Guzhang, Fenghuang (in Baren 叭仁乡), and Xuan'en.
Lect 3: Zhongxin 中心, Baojing County; 30,000 speakers in southeastern Baojing County.
Eastern
Lect 4: Xiaozhang 小章, Luxi County; 6,000 speakers in and around Xiaozhang, Luxi County
Lect 5: Danqing 丹青, Jishou; 48,000 speakers in the counties of northwestern Luxi, eastern Jishou, and southeastern Guzhang.
Lect 6: Dengshang 蹬上, Longshan County; 300 speakers in southern Longshan County and Yongshun County (in Shouche 首车乡).

He Fuling (2009) describes a western Qo Xiong dialect of Gouliang Ethnic Miao Village, Ala Township, Fenghuang County (凤凰县阿拉镇勾良苗寨).

Chen (2009) describes a western Qo Xiong dialect of Daxing Town 大兴镇, Songtao County, Guizhou.

Phonology and script
A written standard based on the Western dialect in Làyǐpíng village and Jíwèi town, Huāyuán county, Xiangxi Tujia and Miao Autonomous Prefecture was established in 1956.

References

Further reading

External links

 Xong comparative vocabulary list on Wiktionary (6 dialects compared)
 Xong basic lexicon at the Global Lexicostatistical Database

Hmongic languages
Languages of China

fr:Miao du Xiangxi occidental